Gersh Itskovich Budker (Герш Ицкович Будкер), also named Andrey Mikhailovich Budker (1 May 1918 – 4 July 1977), was a Soviet physicist, specialized in nuclear physics and accelerator physics.

Biography
He was elected a Corresponding Member of the Siberian Division of the Soviet Academy of Sciences on 28 March 1958 and was promoted to an Academician of the Division of Nuclear Physics on 26 June 1964.

He is best known for his invention in 1968 of electron cooling, a method of reducing the emittance of particle beams by thermalisation with a co-propagating electron beam.

Academician Budker was the founder (in 1959) and first Director of the Budker Institute of Nuclear Physics in Akademgorodok, Russian SFSR. There he lived in the 100-Flat Building. His portrait decorates the famous Round Table Room in the Institute. After his death, the Institute was renamed the Budker Institute for Nuclear Physics in his honor.

Budker became one of the founders of Faculty of Physics of Novosibirsk State University in 1961.

Budker died in Akademgorodok from a heart attack at 59.

Budker's life and works were celebrated in a collection of essays by his colleagues, including Pyotr Kapitsa, Lev Landau, and Andrei Sakharov, and two by Budker himself. The collection, G. I. Budker: Reflections & Remembrances (edited by Boris N. Breizman) was published in 1988 and was later translated into English by James W. Van Dam.

Notes

References

External links

1918 births
1977 deaths
20th-century Russian physicists
People from Vinnytsia Oblast
Scientists from Novosibirsk
Budker Institute of Nuclear Physics
Full Members of the USSR Academy of Sciences
Academic staff of the Moscow Institute of Physics and Technology
Academic staff of Novosibirsk State University
Stalin Prize winners
Lenin Prize winners
Recipients of the Order of Lenin
Recipients of the Order of the Red Banner of Labour
State Prize of the Russian Federation laureates
Accelerator physicists
Jewish Russian physicists
Russian nuclear physicists
Russian physicists
Soviet nuclear physicists
Soviet physicists
Budker